Proto-Torres-Banks (abbr. PTB) is the reconstructed ancestor of the seventeen languages of the Torres and Banks Islands of Vanuatu. Like all indigenous languages of Vanuatu, it belongs to the Oceanic branch of the Austronesian languages.

Descendants
Proto-Torres-Banks is the shared ancestor of the following modern languages: Hiw, Lo-Toga, Lehali, Löyöp, Volow, Mwotlap, Lemerig, Vera'a, Vurës, Mwesen, Mota, Nume, Dorig, Koro, Olrat, Lakon, and Mwerlap.

Reconstruction
Proto-Torres-Banks, as reconstructed with the comparative method from the attested daughter languages, evidently represented an early, mutually intelligible chain of Oceanic dialects in the northern part of Vanuatu, as evidenced by the pattern of loss and retention of the Proto-Oceanic phoneme *R, which merged with *r in the early history of the North-Central Vanuatu dialect chain. It therefore is not a "true" proto-language in the sense of an undifferentiated language ancestral to all Torres–Banks languages, but rather a part of the early North-Central Vanuatu linkage with some dialectal variation across different island groups, before they eventually disintegrated into mutually unintelligible languages.

Elements of the proto-language have been proposed by linguist A. François: vowels and consonants, personal pronouns, space system, vocabulary.

Phonology

Phoneme inventory
Proto-Torres-Banks had 5 phonemic vowels, /i e a o u/, and 16 consonants:
 {|class="wikitable" style="text-align:center"
|+Vowels
! 
! Front
! Back
|-
!Close
| align=center | *
| align=center | *
|-
!Close-mid
| align=center | *
| align=center | *
|-
!Open
| colspan="2" style="text-align:center;"| *
|}

 {| class="wikitable" style="text-align:center"
|+Consonants
! colspan="2" |
!Labiovelar
!Bilabial
!Alveolar
!Dorsal
|-
! rowspan="2" |Stop
!prenasalized
|*
|*
|*
|*
|-
!voiceless
|
|
|*
|
|-
! colspan="2" |Nasal
|*
|*
|*
|*
|-
! colspan="2" |Fricative
|
|* 
|*
|*
|-
! colspan="2" |Approximant
|*
|
|*, *
|*
|}

Following the loss of final POc consonants, syllable structure in Proto-Torres-Banks was open, i.e. (C)V with optional consonant: e.g. POc *matiruʀ "to sleep" > PTB *matiru; POc *laŋit "sky" > PTB *laŋi "wind". No descendant language preserves this situation today, but it can still be found in other related languages such as Gela and Uneapa.

Evolution of vowels
In all of the descendant languages except for Mota, vowel hybridization occurred (a form of metaphony). Later, a process of vowel deletion took place whereby every second vowel, being unstressed, was dropped. This resulted in an increase in the number of vowel phonemes – a process known as transphonologization.

Thus, words which initially had 4 syllables were reduced to 2 syllables (e.g. POc *RapiRapi "evening" >  *raβiˈraβi >  /rɛβrɛβ/ ); *CVCV disyllables were reduced to a single CVC syllable (e.g. POc *roŋoR "to hear" >  *roŋo >  /rɔŋ/); words with 3 syllables ended up with 2, including *CVCVV which became *CVCV (e.g. POc *panua "island, land" >  *βanua >  /βanʊ/).

In Mota, only single high vowels were dropped: e.g. *tolu "three" > /tol/. In the 1880s, Codrington reported cases when Mota had preserved high vowels (e.g. /siwo/ "down"; /tolu/ "three"), which have since disappeared from today's Mota (e.g. /swo/; /tol/).

In Hiw, Lo-Toga and Vera'a, the final vowel was retained as a schwa when it was originally lower than the one under stress: e.g. POc *ikan "fish" >  *íɣa >  /ɪɣə/,  /iɣə/. In Vera'a, the schwa became an echo vowel that is found phrase-finally, but disappears in phrase-medial position: e.g. POc *pulan "moon" >  *βula > *βulə >  /fulʊ/ (/ful/ in phrases).

Examples of reconstructions

Regular sound changes from Proto-Oceanic
The historical sound changes that took place from Proto-Oceanic (POc) to Proto-Torres-Banks (PTB) were intricate, yet largely regular. Some have been reconstructed explicitly, whether on vowels or on consonants; others are implicit in published lists of  lexical reconstructions.

Pervasive phonological sound changes include:
 The loss of all final POc consonants, such as  POc *manuk "bird" >  *manu. This sound change resulted in the language having only open syllables.
 The labialization of POc *p, *ᵐb and *m before *o or *u, resulting in  *w (< *βʷ), *ᵐbʷ and *mʷ (especially in Torres and northern Banks languages).

Considering each POc proto-phoneme sequentially, the  reflexes can be listed in the following table.

Grammar

Example sentence
A reconstructed sentence (from François 2009:191):

Notes

References
 
 
 
 
 
 

Languages of Vanuatu
Banks–Torres languages
Torres-Banks
Torba Province